Alice Normington is a British production designer known for her work on films and television series such as Nowhere Boy, The Secret World of Michael Fry, and Suffragette. She won a BAFTA Award in 1998 for her work on the BBC television series The Woman in White. Normington is a graduate of the Wimbledon School of Art and teaches at The London Film School.

Selected filmography
 Love and Other Disasters (2006)
 Nowhere Boy (2009)
 Suffragette (2015)
 Their Finest (2017)

References

External links

Living people
British production designers
BAFTA winners (people)
European Film Awards winners (people)
Year of birth missing (living people)
Women production designers